"Voices" is a song by American heavy metal band Disturbed. It was released in November 2000, as the third single from their debut album, The Sickness. The song charted at number 16 on the Mainstream Rock Tracks and number 18 on the Modern Rock Tracks. It's also available for sale on the Rock Band music store.

Music video
The music video of the song depicts a businessman who listens to his Walkman constantly. Throughout the video, he imagines various scenarios involving hostile behavior. As David Draiman speaks the song's bridge to the man, he leaves his office and goes to a concert where Disturbed is performing the song.

Also, throughout the video, the band is performing at the concert, as well as the band members performing in different parts of the man's office. The office scenes give nods to The Matrix, hence the Matrix code screensaver on the businessman's computer and the overall look of the office room itself.

The song, "Stupify" can be heard as the man walks to the elevator early in the video.

Live performances
Since its inception into Disturbed's concert setlist, the song has remained something of a staple of their live performances throughout the years, despite lead singer David Draiman's deepened voice. It has been performed at several major music events and festivals, such as Rock am Ring and Music as a Weapon II. It is usually played as the first song in a concert in preparation of the rest of the songs at a concert.

In line with the song's apparent lyrical theme of insanity, when played as the opening song in concerts, Draiman has been seen as being "wheeled" onto the stage in a strait jacket and muzzle in a manner similar to Hannibal Lecter, before breaking free of his restraints and immediately performing his vocals for the song. Draiman has also done this for the song "Perfect Insanity", a song off of their fourth album Indestructible which also deals with the theme of insanity.

Track listing

CD 1
 "Voices" – 3:11
 "Stupify"  – 5:26
 "The Game"  – 3:53

CD 2
 "Voices" – 3:11
 "Down with the Sickness"  – 6:19
 "Voices"  – 3:27

7" red vinyl
 "Voices" – 3:11
 "Voices"

European promo
 "Voices"  – 3:11
 "Voices"  – 3:11

Chart positions

Personnel
 David Draiman – lead vocals
 Dan Donegan – guitar, electronics
 Steve Kmak – bass guitar
 Mike Wengren – drums, percussion, programming

In culture
The song was featured in one of the trailers for the horror film Jeepers Creepers.

References

2000 singles
Disturbed (band) songs
Music videos directed by Gregory Dark
2000 songs
Giant Records (Warner) singles
Songs written by Dan Donegan
Songs written by David Draiman
Songs written by Mike Wengren
Song recordings produced by Johnny K